Maxwell's Plum was a bar at 1181 First Avenue (64th and 1st Avenue) in Manhattan. A 1988 New York Times article described it as a "flamboyant restaurant and singles bar that, more than any place of its kind, symbolized two social revolutions of the 1960s – sex and food".  Owned by Warner LeRoy, it closed abruptly on July 10, 1988.

It opened on April Fool’s Day, April, 1, 1966 by Warner LeRoy, son of Mervyn LeRoy the Hollywood producer (Wizard of Oz, Mister Roberts, Quo Vadis), it was initially part of his theater, providing a cafe with good wine lists and hamburgers for the 1960s swinging singles crowd. It became a favorite gathering spot and within a few years the theater was closed in 1969 to expand the cafe with a luxury dining room reminiscent of Maxim’s in Paris. Patrons enjoyed Maxwell’s Plum mixed experience of a boulevard café or a second floor majestic restaurant that overlooked the first floor singles' bar. Maxwell's Plum rose rapidly to be one of the city's top venues grossing over $5 million by the 1970s, equivalent to $20 million when adjusted for inflation, with alcohol sales contributing more than a third.

It was famous for its eclectic menu ranging from chili and hamburgers to wild boar and caviar, along with its first class service without snobbery and "outlandish Art Nouveau decor – kaleidoscopic stained-glass ceilings and walls, Tiffany lamps galore, a menagerie of ceramic animals, etched glass and cascades of crystal." 

Warner Leroy had two original Toulouse Lautrec paintings in frames screwed into the hall wall leading from mezzanine to upstairs toilets. Two large Tiffany lamps hung over the 2 large tables on the mezzanine level, three steps up from the floor level bar & sitting area. This was during the 1st phase of Maxwell’s Plum. 

It soon served over 1,200 customers a day, including such celebrities as Richard Rodgers, Cary Grant, Bill Blass, Barbra Streisand and Warren Beatty, and becoming what The New York Times called "a favorite watering hole for the 'swinging singles' set." Other celebrities included: Myrna Loy, Buddy Hackett, NY Giants football players (who sat on 2nd floor area), and Vince Edwards (who played Dr Ben Casey).

A second location opened in 1981 San Francisco, California, at a cost of $7 million, then soon closed.  LeRoy built Potomac, a similarly themed 850-seat restaurant in Washington, D.C., the largest in the city's history, which also closed soon after opening at a cost of $9 million.

LeRoy closed the Plum in 1988 when he sold the First Avenue building. In January 1989 the furnishings and contents of Maxwell's Plum were auctioned off. At the auction, the Tribeca Grill acquired the Plum’s large island bar.

References

Defunct restaurants in New York City
Restaurants established in 1966
Restaurants disestablished in 1988
1966 establishments in New York City
Art Nouveau architecture in New York City
Art Nouveau restaurants
1988 disestablishments in New York (state)
Restaurants in San Francisco